The Barababaraba people (also spelt Barapabarapa)  are an indigenous Australian people whose territory covered parts of southern New South Wales and northern Victoria. They had close connections with the Wemba Wemba.

Barababaraba have extensive shared country with their traditional neighbours, the Wemba Wemba and Yorta Yorta, covering what is now Deniliquin, the Kow Swamp and Perrricoota/Koondrook. The Barababaraba form part of the North-West Nations Aboriginal Cultural Heritage Group, and undertake significant cultural heritage and Natural Resource Management work in the area.

Language
R. H. Mathews wrote an early sketch of the grammar of the Barababaraba language, and stated that one dialect at least existed, spoken on the Murray River near Swan Hill.

Country
One early source also has them, perhaps a distinct horde, present in Moulamein It included Cohuna, Gunbower, Brassi, Conargo, and the land south of Carrathool. Deniliquin
Their neighbours to the north west were the Wemba Wemba, the Wergaia frontier was directly to the west, the Yorta Yorta boundaries ran north and south to their east. The Dja Dja Wurrung lay to the south.

Social organization
The Barababaraba hordes had a moiety (kin ship) society divided into two phratries, each comprising two sections. The rules of marriage and affiliation are as follows.
Phratry A:
 (a) a Murri man marries an Ippatha woman. Their sons are Umbi, daughters Butha.
 (b) a Kubbi man marries a Butha woman. Their sons are Ippai, daughters Ippatha.
Phratry B
 (a) An Ippai man marries a Matha woman. Their sons are Kubbi, daughters Kubbitha.
 (b) An Umbi man marries a Kubbitha woman. Their sons are Murri, daughters Matha.

In terms of initiation ceremonies, the Barababaraba rites were essentially the same as those prevailing among the Wiradjuri.

Lifestyle
The Barababaraba were one of the Murray River Wongal-chewing groups: wangul bulrushes were chewed both for the tuberous pith and for the fibrous cortex which was torn away to obtain the latter. The fibre was conserved to make strings for fashioning nets and bags.

History
A mortar in Barababaraba territory, at Koondrook Perricoota Forest near Barbers Creek, was recovered in 2012 and an analysis led to the suggestion that it might have been employed to grind gypsum, used by more northerly tribes in funerals, but here perhaps for obtaining a corroboree body paint.

Alternative names
 Barapa Barapa, Barapabarapa
 Birraba-birraba, Burreba-burreba
 Boorabirraba
 Booraboora
 Boort (toponym)
 Bureba, Burabura
 Burrabura-ba, Baraba-baraba, Barraba-barraba, Bareber Bareber
 Burrappa, Burrapper, Burapper, Barappu
 Karraba (typo)
 Perrepa Perrepa

Some words
 bangga (a boy)
 barapa (no)
 dyelli-dyellic (yesterday)
 gillaty (today)
 kurregurk (a girl)
 lêurk (a woman)
 ngungni (yes)
 perbur (tomorrow)
 wutthu (a man)

Source:

Notes

Citations

Sources

Aboriginal peoples of New South Wales
Aboriginal peoples of Victoria (Australia)
Riverina